The 1975 season was the Minnesota Vikings' 15th in the National Football League.

The Vikings began with a 10-game win streak before losing by one point to the Washington Redskins, though there was generally very little expectation they would equal the 1972 Dolphins' perfect season. The 1975 Vikings had an even easier schedule than the often-criticized one of the unbeaten Dolphin team, with their 14 opponents having a weighted average winning percentage of .332, only two (like the Dolphins) finishing with winning records and nine being 4–10 or worse. Football journalists noted during their streak how the Vikings had been playing very weak schedules for several years and flattered thereby. Their 10–0 start was not subsequently equaled until the 1984 Miami Dolphins began 11–0. According to Pro-Football-Reference.com, only the Super Bowl-winning 1999 Rams have since had a weaker schedule than the 1975 Vikings, playing only one opponent with a winning record during the regular season.

They sealed their third straight NFC Central title on Thanksgiving Day in this same week when the Detroit Lions lost to the Los Angeles Rams.

The Vikings finished with a record of 12 wins and two losses, before losing to the Dallas Cowboys, 17–14 in the NFC Divisional Playoff Game at home due to a play known as the "Hail Mary". Earlier in the season, the New York Jets made their first appearance in Minnesota in a much-anticipated match between Super Bowl quarterbacks Fran Tarkenton and Joe Namath, in what was the first regular season game sold out during the summer.

Offseason

1975 Draft

 The Vikings originally held the 51st overall selection but passed, allowing Pittsburgh to move up before making their pick 52nd overall.
 The Vikings traded CB Charlie West to the Detroit Lions in exchange for Detroit's third-round selection (63rd overall).
 The Vikings traded the third-round selection they acquired from Detroit (63rd overall) to the New Orleans Saints in exchange for OL Andy Maurer.
 The details of this trade are unknown.
 The Vikings originally held the 259th overall selection but moved up to 258th overall when the Oakland Raiders passed.
 The Vikings originally held the 337th overall selection but moved up to 336th overall when the Washington Redskins passed on the 334th overall selection and allowed Miami, San Diego, Minnesota, Pittsburgh, Miami, Baltimore, Atlanta, Cleveland, Chicago, and New Orleans to move up.
 The Vikings originally held the 389th overall selection but moved up to 388th overall when the Oakland Raiders passed.
 The Vikings originally held the 415th overall selection but moved up to 414th overall when the Baltimore Colts passed and allowed Minnesota and Pittsburgh to move up.

Roster

Preseason

Regular season

Schedule

Game summaries

Week 1: vs. San Francisco 49ers

Standings

Postseason

Schedule

Game summaries

NFC Divisional Playoffs: vs. (#4) Dallas Cowboys

Awards and records
 Fran Tarkenton, Bert Bell Award, and AP MVP
 AP First Team All-Pro selections: RB Chuck Foreman, S Paul Krause, DT Alan Page, QB Fran Tarkenton and T Ron Yary
 Chuck Foreman, set an NFL record with 73 receptions, most by a running back
 DE Jim Marshall, recovered 26th fumble, a new league record 
 Pro Bowl selections: Bobby Bryant, Chuck Foreman, John Gilliam, Paul Krause, Alan Page, Jeff Siemon, Fran Tarkenton, Ed White and Ron Yary

Statistics

Team leaders

* Vikings single season record.

League rankings

References

1975
Minnesota
NFC Central championship seasons
Minnesota Vikings